Rajendra Prasad Singh (Rajender Babu) was an Indian politician from Bihar and Jharkhand. He was member of the Indian National Congress. He was elected as a member of the Jharkhand Legislative Assembly from Bermo constituency in 2019. He was the leader of the opposition in the Jharkhand Legislative Assembly from 2010 to 2013, when Arjun Munda was chief minister of Jharkhand. Rajender Babu has been a minister in Bihar and Jharkhand. He died in May 2020
His son Kumar Jaimangal Singh became MLA from Bermo assembly.

References

20th-century births
2020 deaths
Bihar MLAs 1985–1990
Bihar MLAs 1990–1995
Bihar MLAs 1995–2000
Jharkhand MLAs 2000–2005
Jharkhand MLAs 2009–2014
Jharkhand MLAs 2019–2024
Indian National Congress politicians from Jharkhand
Year of birth missing